This is a list of Portuguese television related events from 1967.

Events
25 February - Eduardo Nascimento is selected to represent Portugal at the 1967 Eurovision Song Contest with his song "O vento mudou". He is selected to be the fourth Portuguese Eurovision entry during Festival da Canção held at Estúdios da Tóbis in Lisbon.

Debuts

Television shows

Ending this year

Births

Deaths